Howard Earl Glenn (September 26, 1934 – October 9, 1960) was an American gridiron football player.  He played collegiately at Linfield College and professionally with the Hamilton Tiger-Cats of the Canadian Football League (CFL) and in the American Football League (AFL). He was the only AFL player to die from injuries sustained in a regular season football game.

Glenn was born in Vancouver, Washington, and played high school football in Louisville, Kentucky. At Linfield College in McMinnville, Oregon, he played tight end and in 1956 caught a 75-yard touchdown pass. He was named to the all-Northwest Conference team in 1957.

In 1960, the AFL's inaugural season, Glenn joined the AFL New York Titans as an offensive guard. Glenn sustained a broken neck in the first half during a game vs. the Houston Oilers on October 9, 1960, at Jeppesen Stadium and died later that day.

References

1934 births
1960 deaths
American football offensive linemen
Canadian football offensive linemen
American players of Canadian football
Hamilton Tiger-Cats players
Linfield Wildcats football players
New York Titans (AFL) players
Sportspeople from Vancouver, Washington
Players of American football from Louisville, Kentucky
Players of Canadian football from Louisville, Kentucky
Sports deaths in Texas